was a Japanese imperial princess and artist. She was the eighth daughter of Emperor Go-Mizunoo.

The Kosetsu Memorial Museum held a special exhibition on Japanese female artists, in which her work was also exhibited.

See also 
 Kiyohara Yukinobu (1643–82)
 Tokuyama Gyokuran (1727/8–84)
 Ema Saikō (1787–1861)

References 

1634 births
1727 deaths
17th-century Japanese artists
Japanese princesses
Edo period Buddhist clergy
Japanese women artists
18th-century Japanese artists
17th-century Japanese women
18th-century Japanese women